The 2000 Oklahoma Sooners football team represented the University of Oklahoma in the 2000 NCAA Division I-A football season, the 106th season of Sooner football. The team was led by Bob Stoops in his second season as head coach. They played their home games at Oklahoma Memorial Stadium in Norman. During this season, they competed in the Big 12 Conference.

The Sooners opened the season ranked #19, the first time they had made it into a pre-season poll in five years. 

After four early-season victories against unranked foes, Oklahoma had risen to #10 in the country. 

Beginning at the end of September, OU defeated #11 Texas (63-14), #2 Kansas State (41-31), and #1 Nebraska (31-14). By that point, the Sooners had risen to #1 in the polls, a position they retained through the rest of the season. 

The 2000 team claimed OU’s first Big 12 title and its 37th conference title overall by beating Kansas State in the Big 12 conference championship game. 

The Sooners were invited to the 2001 Orange Bowl, which served as the BCS National Championship Game that year, where they beat the defending national champion Florida State Seminoles by a score of 13-2. 

The Sooners finished the season 13-0, claiming Oklahoma's seventh national championship in football. 

Three OU players were named consensus All Americans after the 2000 season: linebacker Rocky Calmus, quarterback Josh Heupel, and free safety J. T. Thatcher.

Recruits

Source:

Schedule

Roster

Game summaries

UTEP

Arkansas State

Rice

Kansas

Texas (Red River Shootout)

Kansas State

Nebraska

Baylor

Texas A&M

Texas Tech

Oklahoma State (Bedlam Series)

Kansas State (Big 12 Championship Game)

Florida State (Orange Bowl)

Rankings

Awards and honors

All-Americans

Rocky Calmus – LB
Josh Heupel – QB
J. T. Thatcher – FS
Source:

Individual award winners

Josh Heupel – Walter Camp Award
J. T. Thatcher – Mosi Tatupu Award
Source:

2001 NFL draft

The 2001 NFL Draft was held on April 21–22, 2001 at the Theatre at Madison Square Garden in New York City. The following Oklahoma players were either selected or signed as undrafted free agents following the draft.

References

Oklahoma
Oklahoma Sooners football seasons
BCS National Champions
Big 12 Conference football champion seasons
Orange Bowl champion seasons
College football undefeated seasons
Oklahoma Sooners football